Christian Manz is a British visual effects artist. He was nominated for an Academy Award in the category Best Visual Effects for the film Harry Potter and the Deathly Hallows – Part 1.

Selected filmography 
 Harry Potter and the Deathly Hallows – Part 1 (2010; co-nominated with Tim Burke, John Richardson and Nicolas Aithadi)

References

External links 

Living people
Place of birth missing (living people)
Year of birth missing (living people)
Visual effects artists
Visual effects supervisors